Friedrich David Gilly (16 February 1772 – 3 August 1800) was a German architect and the son of the architect David Gilly. His works are influenced by revolutionary architecture (Revolutionsarchitektur). Born in Altdamm, Pomerania, (today Dąbie, district of Szczecin, Poland), Gilly was known as a prodigy and the teacher of the young Karl Friedrich Schinkel.

In 1788 he enrolled at the Akademie der Bildenden Künste in Berlin. His teachers in architecture were Friedrich Becherer and Carl Gotthard Langhans. Gilly enjoyed drawing lessons with Christian Bernhard Rode, Johann Christoph Frisch, Johann Heinrich Meil, Daniel Nikolaus Chodowiecki and Johann Gottfried Schadow. In the practical part, he was taught by Carl Gotthard Langhans, Michael Philipp Boumann and Baron Friedrich Wilhelm von Erdmannsdorff.

He was first employed by the Oberhofbauamt in 1789, and worked for a time with Bernhard Matthias Brasch on the reconstruction of Neuruppin.

In 1797, Gilly travelled extensively in France, England, and Austria. The drawings he made in France reveal his interests in architecture and reflect the intellectual climate of the Directoire. They include views of the Fountain of Regeneration, the Rue des Colonnes—an arcaded street of baseless Doric columns leading to the Théâtre Feydeau—the chamber of the Conseil des Anciens in the Tuileries and Jean-Jacques Rousseau’s grotto in its landscaped setting at Ermenonville, Oise.

His 1797, design for the  Frederick II monument reveals his debt to French neoclassicism, in particular Etienne-Louis Boullée. His explanatory notes indicate that he intended the building to be spiritually uplifting. The plan for the monument is currently part of the collection of the Kupferstichkabinett in Berlin.

From 1799, Schinkel lived in the Gilly household at Berlin and was taught by Friedrich and Friedrich's architect father David Gilly.

Gilly was appointed professor at the Berlin Bauakademie at the age of 26. Of his built designs, only one survives: the ruinous Greek Revival mausoleum (1800–02; destroyed after 1945) at Dyhernfurth near Breslau (now Brzeg Dolny near Wrocław, Poland), in the form of a prostyle Greek temple.

Gilly died from tuberculosis at the age of 28 in Karlsbad, where he was buried in the cemetery of Andreaskapelle.

References

In English 
 Friedrich Gilly: Essays on Architecture, 1796-1799. Introduction by Fritz Neumeyer. Translation by David Britt. 1994, 240 pages.
 Karl-Eugen Kurrer: The History of the Theory of Structures. Searching for Equilibrium. Ernst & Sohn, Berlin 2018, S. 937 ff., .

In German 
 F[riedrich] Adler: Friedrich Gilly – Schinkel's Lehrer, in: Zentralblatt der Bauverwaltung, Jg. 1, 1881, Hefte 1–3 (Digitalisat).
 Cord-Friedrich Berghahn: Das Wagnis der Autonomie. Studien zu Karl Philipp Moritz, Wilhelm von Humboldt, Heinrich Gentz, Friedrich Gilly und Ludwig Tieck. Universitätsverlag Winter, Heidelberg 2012, .
 Michael Bollé, María Ocón Fernández: Die Büchersammlung Friedrich Gillys (1772–1800). Provenienz und Schicksal einer Architektenbibliothek im theoretischen Kontext des 18. Jahrhunderts. Gebr. Mann, Berlin 2019. .
 Sabine Bock: Gilly, Friedrich (1772–1800). In: Dirk Alvermann, Nils Jörn (Hrsg.): Biographisches Lexikon für Pommern. Band 1 (= Veröffentlichungen der Historischen Kommission für Pommern. Reihe V, Band 48,1). Böhlau Verlag, Köln Weimar Wien 2013, S. 100–101.
 Adolph Doebber: Gilly, Friedrich. In: Ulrich Thieme, Fred. C. Willis (Hrsg.): Begründet von Ulrich Thieme und Felix Becker. Band 14: Giddens–Gress. E. A. Seemann, Leipzig 1921, S. 48–49 (Textarchiv – Internet Archive).
 Friedrich Gilly, Friedrich Frick: Schloss Marienburg in Preussen. In Lieferungen erschienen 1799–1803. Das Ansichtenwerk neu herausgegeben von Wilhelm Salewski. Galtgarben Verlag, Düsseldorf 1965.
 Friedrich Gilly 1772–1800 und die Privatgesellschaft junger Architekten. Hrsg. Rolf Bothe, Berlin Museum, 21. September bis 4. November 1984 (Ausstellungskatalog), Koordination Brigitte Schütz, Verlag Willmuth Arenhövel, Berlin 1984, .
 Otto Holtze: Friedrich Gilly. In: Pommersche Lebensbilder. Band 3: Pommern des 18., 19. und 20. Jahrhunderts. Saunier, Stettin 1939, S. 204–215.
 Alste Horn-Oncken: Gilly, Friedrich David. In: Neue Deutsche Biographie (NDB). Band 6, Duncker & Humblot, Berlin 1964, S. 399 f. (Digitalisat).
 Konrad Levezow: Denkschrift auf Friedrich Gilly, königlichen Architecten und Professor der Academie der Baukunst zu Berlin. Verlag der Realschulbuchhandlung, Berlin 1801.
 Arthur Moeller van den Bruck: Gilly. In: Arthur Moeller van den Bruck: Der preussische Stil. Piper, München 1916, S. 109–129.
 Fritz Neumeyer (Hrsg.): Friedrich Gilly. Essays zur Architektur, 1796–1799. = Gilly, Essays. Ernst & Sohn, Berlin 1997, .
 Alste Oncken: Friedrich Gilly. 1772–1800 (= Forschungen zur deutschen Kunstgeschichte. Bd. 5,  = Jahresgabe des Deutschen Vereins für Kunstwissenschaft. 1935). Deutscher Verein für Kunstwissenschaft, Berlin 1935 (korrigierter, im Wesentlichen aber unveränderter Nachdruck. (= Die Bauwerke und Kunstdenkmäler von Berlin. Beiheft 7). Gebr. Mann, Berlin 1981).
 Hella Reelfs: Friedrich und David Gilly in neuer Sicht. In: Kunstgeschichtliche Gesellschaft zu Berlin. Sitzungsberichte. NF Bd. 28/29, 1979/1981, S. 18–23.
 Alfred Rietdorf: Gilly. Wiedergeburt der Architektur. Hans von Hugo, Berlin 1940.
 Hermann Schmitz: Die Baumeister David und Friedrich Gilly in ihren Beziehungen zu Pommern. In: Monatsblätter der Gesellschaft für pommersche Geschichte und Altertumskunde. Jg. 23, 1909, S. 81–87 und S. 108–111.
 Hermann Schmitz: Friedrich Gilly. In: Kunst und Künstler. Bd. 7, 1909, S. 201–206, Digitalisat.
 Gerd-Helge Vogel (Hrsg.): Friedrich Gilly 1772–1800. Innovation und Tradition klassizistischer Architektur in Europa. Geidberg-Verlag, Güstrow 2002, .
 Eduard Wätjen: Friedrich Gillys Entwurf für ein Denkmal König Friedrichs II. von Preußen. In: Münchner Jahrbuch der bildenden Kunst. Bd. 51, 2000, S. 199–228.

Bust by Schadow 
 Bust of Friedrich Gilly (by Johann Gottfried Schadow, 1801)

Citations 

1772 births
1800 deaths
18th-century German architects
19th-century deaths from tuberculosis
Tuberculosis deaths in Germany
German neoclassical architects
People from the Province of Pomerania
People from Szczecin